Anju Chaudhuri (born 1944) is an Indian artist.

In Paris she was taught engraving by Stanley William Hayter.

Chaudhuri's work is in the permanent collection of the Victoria and Albert Museum in London and the  National Gallery of Modern Art.

References

External links 
 Pundole Gallery Bombay

Bengali women artists
French people of Indian descent
Living people
1944 births
Women artists from West Bengal